Beverly Marie Lewis (née Jones) is a Christian fiction novelist and adult and children's author of over 100 books.

Lewis is a former schoolteacher and musician.  She started playing the piano at age four, and began writing short stories and poetry when she was nine years old.

Much of her writing focuses on the Old Order Amish. Her maternal grandmother, Ada Ranck Buchwalter, was born into an Old Order Mennonite Church, which interested Lewis in her own "plain heritage." Her father was a pastor in Lancaster, Pennsylvania (the heart of the Pennsylvania Dutch community), where she was born and grew up.  She was raised and continues to be part of the Assemblies of God community.

She went to Evangel University, and received the Distinguished Alumnus Award in 2003.  She is also a member of the National League of American Pen Women.

Lewis is married to David Lewis, and they have three grown children and three grandchildren. They live in Colorado.

Awards
 Rated 8 among the Top 10 Christian Authors for 2009 by the ECPA.
  ECPA 2011's BestSeller ListsBest of 2011.
  ECPA 2011's BestSeller ListsBest of 2011.
 The Brethren: won the Christy Award in 2007 for Contemporary Series.
 The Preacher's Daughter: won the Library Journal's Best Genre Fiction in 2005.
 The Prodigal: Crossings Book of the Year in 2004.
 The Betrayal: Inspirational Readers Choice - first place for Long Historical in 2004.

List of works 
The full collection of listed books have been published by Bethany House publishers.

The Heritage of Lancaster County series 
Series reprinted in 2002.

 The Shunning, 1997
 The Confession, 1997
 The Reckoning, 1998

The Amish Country Crossroads Series 
Series reprinted in 2007.

 The Postcard, 1999
 The Crossroad, 1999
 Sanctuary, June 2001(  with David Lewis)

Abram's Daughters series 

 The Covenant, September 2002
 The Betrayal, September 2003
 The Sacrifice, May 2004
 The Prodigal, October 2004
 The Revelation, June 2005

Annie's People series 

 The Preacher's daughter, November 2005
 The Englisher, May 2006
 The Brethren, October 2006

The Courtship of Nellie Fisher series 
 The Parting, 2007
 The Forbidden, May 2008
 The Longing, October 2008

Seasons of Grace series 
 The Secret, April 2009
 The Missing, September 2009
 The Telling, April 6, 2010

The Rose Trilogy 
 The Thorn, September 2010
 The Judgment, April 2011
 The Mercy, September 2011

Home to Hickory Hollow Series
 The Fiddler, April 2012
 The Bridesmaid, September 2012
 The Guardian, March 2013
 The Secret Keeper, September 2013
 The Last Bride, April 2014

Other works 
 The Sunroom, May 1998
 The Redemption of Sarah Cain, July 2000
 October Song, October 2001
 The Beverly Lewis Amish Heritage Cookbook, 2004
 "The Atonenent", 2016
 "The First Love", 2018

Youth Fiction

The Cul-de-Sac Kids series 
 The Double Dabble Surprise, March 1995
 The Chicken Pox Panic, March 1995
 The Crazy Christmas Angel Mystery, March 1995
 No Grown-ups Allowed, August 1995
 Frog Power, August 1995
 The Mystery of Case D. Luc, August 1995
 The Stinky Sneakers Mystery, May 1996
 Pickle Pizza ,May 1996
 Mailbox Mania, May 1996
 The Mudhole Mystery, March 1997
 Fiddlesticks, March 1997
 The Crabby Cat Caper, March 1997
 Tarantula Toes, August 1997
 Green Gravy, August 1997
 Backyard Bandit Mystery, August 1997
 Tree House Trouble, February 1998
 The Creepy Sleep-Over, February 1998
 The Great TV Turn-Off, February 1998
 Piggy Party, February 1999
 The Granny Game, February 1999
 Mystery Mutt, February 2000
 Big Bad Beans, February 2000
 The Upside-Down Day, January 2001
 The Midnight Mystery, January 2001

Girls Only (GO!) series 
These books were republished by Bethany House into two volumes (books 1–4, books 5–8) in 2008.
  Dreams on Ice, August 1998
 Only the Best, September 1998
 A Perfect Match, May 1999
 Reach for the Stars, September 1999
 Follow the Dream, July 2000
 Better Than Best, October 2000
 Photo Perfect, May 2001
 Star Status, May 2002

Holly's Heart series 
These books were republished by Bethany House into 3 volumes (books 1–5, books 6–10, books 11–14) in September 2008.
  Best Friend, Worst Enemy, November 2001
 Secret Summer Dreams, November 2001
 Sealed With a Kiss, January 2002
 The Trouble With Weddings, January 2002
 California Crazy, July 2002
 Second-Best Friend, July 2002
 Good-Bye, Dressel Hills, November 2002
 Straight-A Teacher, November 2002
 No Guys Pact, January 2003
 Little White Lies, January 2003
 Freshman Frenzy, May 2003
 Mystery Letters, May 2003
 Eight is Enough, November 2003
 It's a Girl Thing, November 2003

Summerhill Secrets series 
These books were republished by Bethany House into 2 volumes (books 1–5, books 6–10) in 2007.
  Whispers Down the Lane, May 1995
 Secret in the Willows, May 1995
 Catch a Falling Star, November 1995
 Night of the Fireflies, November 1995
 A Cry in the Dark, June 1996
 House of Secrets, November 1996
 Echoes in the Wind, June 1997
 Hide Behind the Moon, April 1998
 Windows on the Hill, March 1999
 Shadows Beyond the Gate, April 2000

Other picture books 
 Cows in the House, October 1998
 Just Like Mama, October 2002
 Annika's Secret Wish with CD, October 2004
 What is Heaven Like?, October 2006
 In Jesse's Shoes, Fall 2007
 What is God Like?, September 2008

Movies based on books by Lewis 
 Saving Sarah Cain is based on the 2000 standalone novel, The Redemption of Sarah Cain.  The movie was first shown on Lifetime in 2007.  The DVD was released on January 15, 2008.
 The Shunning, based on the first novel in Lewis' Heritage of Lancaster County series, was announced as a movie in 2011. It premiered on the Hallmark channel on April 16, 2011, in the U.S.
 The Confession, based on the second novel in Lewis' Heritage of Lancaster County series, was announced as a movie in 2012. It premiered on the Hallmark channel on May 11, 2013, in the U.S.
 The Reckoning, based on the third novel in Lewis' Heritage of Lancaster County series, premiered on the Hallmark channel on October 11, 2015, in the U.S.

References

External links
 Official website
 Bethany House: Beverly Lewis
 FaithfulReader.com: interview
 Fantastic Fiction: Beverly Lewis

Year of birth missing (living people)
Living people
20th-century American novelists
21st-century American novelists
American children's writers
Christian writers
American women novelists
Evangel University alumni
American women children's writers
20th-century American women writers
21st-century American women writers
Assemblies of God people
Novelists from Colorado
American Mennonites
Mennonite writers